Horse Head Island (old spelling: Agpalersalik) is an uninhabited island in Avannaata municipality in northwestern Greenland.

Geography 
Horse Head Island is an outlying island in Tasiusaq Bay, an indentation of Baffin Bay in the north-central part of Upernavik Archipelago. The closest island is Tuttorqortooq Island in the east.

References 

Uninhabited islands of Greenland
Tasiusaq Bay
Islands of the Upernavik Archipelago